Monica Ene Ogah  (born August 7, 1994), commonly known as Monica Ogah, is a Nigerian singer, the 2011 winner of the fourth edition of MTN Project Fame West Africa. As a prize, Ogah was given a record deal and her first album, Sometime in August, was released in August 2013.

Early life
The youngest of six children, Monica Ogah was born on August 7, 1994 in Makurdi, Benue State. She credits her mother, a choir mistress, as one of her earliest influences. She said in an interview with Thisday News: "[Mother] would also remind me of how sweet my voice was when I made those innocent cries which she believed was laced with God's given voice." She further revealed that her father had hoped that she would become a nurse and would not support her musical aspirations until she gained entrance into the Project Fame reality show where she would emerge from popular finalists as the victor.

Ogah's early education was at Bammco Nursery and Primary School. She later attended Methodist Girls' High School in Otukpo, Benue State. Her singing talent was first honed during Sunday school at her childhood church.

Career
Monica Ogah auditioned for the fourth edition of Project Fame West Africa in August 2011. She made it past the audition stage and was among the nineteen contestants to join the music academy. Ogah shined throughout her time on the show, garnering positive comments from the judges, who praised her performance. On December 18, 2011, she was declared the winner, making her the second female after Chidinma to win the competition. As a prize for the victory, Ogah received a recording contract with Ultima Studios while being managed by Goretti Company.

In August 2013, two years after her appearance on Project Fame, Ogah released her debut studio album, Sometime in August, which featured collaborations with singers Wizboyy and Chidinma. Contributions to the album's production came from TY Mix, Del B, Silvastone, Wizboyy, J. Sleek and the Suspekt. Her singing style ranges from R&B, pop, and soul to highlife. Preceding its release, the album's lead single "Body Hug" received significant airplay on radio stations across Nigeria and the song's music video, directed by Clarence Peters achieved considerable popularity.

In April 2014, Ogah released an Igbo language love song titled "Obim bu nke gi" which features Harrysongz. The music video accompanying the song was filmed in South Africa.

Discography

Studio albums
 Sometime in August (2013)

Awards and nominations

References

Living people
1994 births
Nigerian rhythm and blues singer-songwriters
21st-century Nigerian  women singers
Musicians from Makurdi
Musicians from Benue State
Nigerian soul singers
Nigerian women pop singers
Nigerian women singer-songwriters
Nigerian highlife musicians
Igbo-language singers
Nigerian Christians
Participants in Nigerian reality television series